The Massey-Harris Model 20 was a two-plow tractor built by Massey-Harris (later Massey Ferguson) from 1946-1948. Introduced to commemorate Massey's 100th anniversary in 1947, the 20 was virtually identical to the earlier Model 81, which first appeared in 1941. About 8,000 Model 20s were sold, in row crop or standard models, with the choice of gasoline or kerosene (known as tractor vaporising oil, or TVO, in Britain) as fuel. The Model 20 was replaced in 1948 by the Model 22.

Pricing
With a base price of around C$1450, about C$500 more than the 81, the 20 was competitive with Ford and Ferguson-Brown models of the period.

Weight
The bare weight without ballast was 3,000 lb (1,350 kg) (some 700 lb {300 kg} less than the contemporary Model 30, which dramatically outsold it, but about 400 lb {180 kg} more than the earlier 81).

Engine
The 124 in3 (2,031 cc) engine inherited from the 81, and the 101 before it, produced 31 hp (23 kW) at the belt, and was manufactured by Continental, like all Massey Harris tractors at the time.

Transmission
The 20 offered four speeds (against the 30's five), providing a top speed of 2.5 mph (4 km/h) in first (low) and 13.5 mph (21.6 km/h) in fourth (high).

References

Sources

Further reading
Pripps, Robert N. The Big Book of Farm Tractors. Vancouver, BC: Raincoast Books, 2001. .
__. The Field Guide to Vintage Farm Tractors. Stillwater, MN: Voyageur Press, 2001.
__. Vintage Ford Tractors. Stillwater, MN: Voyageur Press, 2001.
Denison, Merrill. Harvest Triumphant: The Story of Massey-Harris. New York: Dodd Mead, 1949.
Farnsworth, John. The Massey Legacy. Ipswich, Great Britain: Farming Press, 1997.
Gay, Larry. Farm Tractors 1975-1995. Saint Joseph, MI: American Society of Agricultural Engineers, 1995.
Wendel, C. H. Massey Tractors. Osceola, WI: Motorbooks International, 1992.

Tractors
Massey-Harris vehicles